TD-3 or TD3 may refer to:
Dempsey TD-3 Beta Lightning, an American homebuilt aircraft design
Taiwan Dancer TD-3, a Taiwanese homebuilt aircraft design
Test Drive III: The Passion, a 1990 video game
Yamaha TD3, a racing motorcycle
 Behringer TD-3 synthesizer (Roland TB-303 clone)